Gangliosidosis contains different types of lipid storage disorders caused by the accumulation of lipids known as gangliosides. There are two distinct genetic causes of the disease.  Both are autosomal recessive and affect males and females equally.

Types
 GM1 gangliosidoses - GM1
 GM2 gangliosidoses - GM2

See also
 Sphingolipidoses#Overview

References

External links 

Autosomal recessive disorders
Lipid storage disorders
Rare diseases